Terence William John Kelly (16 January 1932 – 2 August 2007) was an English professional footballer, who played for Vauxhall Motors, Luton Town, Dunstable Town and Cambridge City. He played 150 games for the Hatters between 1950 and 1963, scoring once.

References

1932 births
2007 deaths
English footballers
Association football central defenders
English Football League players
Luton Town F.C. players
Cambridge City F.C. players
Dunstable Town F.C. players
Place of birth missing
Footballers from Luton